Edwin Forrest Sweet (November 21, 1847 – April 2, 1935) was an American politician from the U.S. state of Michigan.

Early life
Edwin F. Sweet was born in Dansville, New York. He was the son of Sidney Sweet and Hannah (née Redmond) Sweet. He attended the common schools and Dansville Seminary.  He graduated from the literary department of Yale College in 1871, where he was a member of Skull and Bones. He was a brother of the Delta Kappa Epsilon fraternity (Phi chapter).

After graduation, Sweet engaged in a tour of Europe and the Holy Land. Departing from New York city October 9, 1871, he went to Liverpool, Wales, London, Paris, Marseilles, Rome, Naples, and Brindisi. He then sailed to Alexandria, Egypt, went up the River Nile to the first Cataract, and then spent a month in Palestine. On his return, he passed through Syria, Constantinople, Athens, Venice, Switzerland, Austria, Prussia, Sweden, and Scotland. He returned to New York City one year to the day after his departure. In January 1873, he entered the law department of the University of Michigan at Ann Arbor and graduated in 1874.

Career
He was admitted to the bar in 1874 and was employed as a clerk in the law firm of Hughes, O'Brien & Smiley in Grand Rapids, Michigan. In April 1876, he formed the law firm of Stuart & Sweet. Sweet was a member of the board of education from 1899 to 1906.

He served as Mayor of Grand Rapids from 1904 to 1906. Sweet defeated incumbent Republican U.S. Representative Gerrit J. Diekema, to be elected as a Democrat from Michigan's 5th congressional district to the 62nd United States Congress, serving from March 4, 1911 to March 3, 1913. In 1912, he lost in the general election to Republican Carl E. Mapes.

In 1913, Sweet was appointed by U.S. President Woodrow Wilson to be Assistant Secretary of Commerce, where he served until 1921.  In 1916 he was an unsuccessful candidate for Governor of Michigan, losing to Albert Sleeper. He was member of the board of education of Grand Rapids from 1923 to 1926 and a member of the city commission from 1926 to 1928.

In the early 1880s, he invested in the Sweet Ranch in Dickey County, North Dakota. He is listed as the founder of Fullerton, North Dakota which was named in honor of his father-in-law and owner of the Carroll House Hotel in Fullerton which is now listed on the National Register of Historic Places.

Personal life
In 1876, Sweet was married to Sophia Fuller Sweet (1854–1923), daughter of Grand Rapids attorney Edward Philo Fuller (1820–1886). Together, they were the parents of:

 Carroll Fuller Sweet (1877–1955), who married Agnes Marie Callahan (1885–1969) in 1908.
 George Philo Sweet (1881–1924), who married Jessie Louise Ellicott died from tuberculosis at the age of 42.

He resided in Grand Rapids until 1928 when he retired and moved to Ojai, California where he died on April 2, 1935.  He is interred in Oakhill Cemetery, Grand Rapids.

Upon learning of Sweet's death, Carl Mapes said on the floor of the House of Representatives on April 3, 1935: "Mr. Speaker, the morning's paper carries the notice of the death, in California, of a former distinguished Democratic Member of the House, who represented the Fifth Congressional District of Michigan in the Sixty-second Congress, Hon. Edwin F. Sweet. He died at the ripe old age of 87. After his service in the House, he served as Assistant Secretary of Commerce during the 8 years of the Wilson administration. He was an honored and highly respected citizen and a capable and patriotic public servant."

References

Further reading

Sweet, Edwin Forrest (1847-1935) The Political Graveyard 

1847 births
1935 deaths
Mayors of Grand Rapids, Michigan
Yale College alumni
University of Michigan Law School alumni
Democratic Party members of the United States House of Representatives from Michigan
People from Dansville, New York
People from Ojai, California
School board members in Michigan